Mebane  is a city located mostly in Alamance County, North Carolina, United States, and partly in Orange County. The town was named for Alexander Mebane, an American Revolutionary War general and member of the U.S. Congress. It was incorporated as "Mebanesville" in 1881, and in 1883 the name was changed to "Mebane". It was incorporated as a city in 1987.  The population as of the 2020 census was 17,768.
Mebane is one of the fastest-growing municipalities in North Carolina. Mebane straddles the Research Triangle and Piedmont Triad Regions of North Carolina. The bulk of the city is in Alamance County, which comprises the Burlington Metropolitan Statistical Area, itself a component of the Greensboro-Winston-Salem-High Point Combined Statistical Area. Two slivers in the eastern portion of the city are in Orange County, which is part of the Durham-Chapel Hill Metropolitan Statistical Area, itself a component of the Raleigh-Durham-Chapel Hill Combined Statistical Area.

History
The town was incorporated as Mebansville in 1880. Its name was changed to Mebane three years later. It is named after Brigadier General Alexander Mebane, an officer during the American Revolution who later served as a U.S. Congressman.

The Charles F. and Howard Cates Farm, William Cook House, Cooper School, Cross Roads Presbyterian Church and Cemetery and Stainback Store, Durham Hosiery Mill No. 15, Griffis-Patton House, Thomas Guy House, Hawfields Presbyterian Church, Henderson Scott Farm Historic District, Mebane Commercial Historic District, Old South Mebane Historic District, Paisley-Rice Log House, White Furniture Company, and Woodlawn School are listed on the National Register of Historic Places.

In 1939 as part of the New Deal, Margaret C. Gates won a competition sponsored by the Section of Painting and Sculpture of the Treasury Department to create a post office mural in Mebane. Her painting, Landscape—Tobacco Curing, which showed a man and a young boy walking in tandem on their way to work on a tobacco farm, was completed and installed in 1941. In 1965, when the post office was remodeled, the mural was damaged beyond repair, as officials tried to remove it for restoration. A local artist, Henry E. Rood III, was hired to create an exact replica of the painting to adorn the new facility.

While the North Carolina Department of Transportation has long had plans to reroute North Carolina Highway 119, currently running through the city's downtown, to a new alignment further west, concerns in predominantly African-American communities along the proposed route, combined with longstanding dissatisfaction with access to municipal services, resulted in civil rights complaints being filed by the West End Revitalization Association and other local residents against the Department of Transportation and city government. Although a four-year moratorium on the project was established in 1999, the Federal Highway Administration eventually granted approval in December 2009.

In October 2014, the city council voted to adopt a new seal and slogan, replacing "A progressive community, the perfect place to call home" with "Positively Charming".

Geography
Mebane is located at  (36.095957, -79.270861).

Demographics

2020 census

As of the 2020 United States census, there were 17,797 people, 5,763 households, and 3,745 families residing in the city.

2010 census
As of the census of 2010, there were 11,393 people living in the city. The population density was 1,363 people per square mile (480.7/km). There were 5,045 housing units at an average density of 554.5 per square mile (214.2/km). The racial makeup of the city was 73.5% White, 20.4% African American, 0.5% Native American, 1.2% Asian, 0.1% Pacific Islander, 0.2% from other races, and 2.6% from two or more races. Hispanic or Latino of any race were 6% of the population.

Telephone service
Mebane straddles the Research Triangle and the Piedmont Triad areas of North Carolina. However, a majority of the phone numbers listed for the city are in the 919/984 area code, whereas the rest of Alamance County is situated in the 336/743 area code. When the Triad was split off into area code 910 in 1993, it was decided that Mebane would stay in 919 to keep the entire city within the same area code. This was retained even after the Triad split from 910 as its own area code, 336, in 1998. Since then, 984 has been introduced as an overlay with 919, followed by 743 as an overlay for 336.

Media
Reflecting that the city is split between two television markets, Spectrum's Mebane system offers stations from both the Triad and Triangle. DirecTV, Dish Network and U-verse customers receive the Triad local feed, since most of the city is in Alamance County. Mebane has a weekly community newspaper, the Mebane Enterprise, which cover the Mebane city government, local arts and culture, high school sports and local breaking news.

Airport
Mebane is home to Hurdle Field, airport code 4W7.

Education
The Alamance County portion is served by the Alamance-Burlington School System (which was created by a merger between the Alamance County School System and the Burlington City School System in 1996), while the Orange County portion is served by Orange County Schools.

The public schools serving Mebane residents within Alamance County include Eastern Alamance High School, Hawfields Middle School, Woodlawn Middle School, Audrey W. Garrett Elementary School, South Mebane Elementary School, and E. M. Yoder Elementary School; all part of the Alamance - Burlington School System (ABSS).

Mebane residents in the Orange County portion are zoned to Efland Cheeks Elementary School, Gravely Hill Middle School, Orange Middle School, Orange High School, and Cedar Ridge High School.

There is one private school in Mebane, Bradford Academy, a classical Christian school started in 2008.

Mebane is within  of several notable universities, including Duke University, UNC Chapel Hill, North Carolina Central University and Elon University.

Shopping

Downtown Mebane was named a Top Five Great Place in North Carolina for 2017. 
Downtown Mebane is home to many high-end home furnishing stores, antique shops, and trendy clothing stores. The downtown also houses a wide variety of restaurants including Junction on 70 (local fare), The Mebane Downtown Table (fine dining restaurant) and many more. The downtown area also boasts several antique and curio shops, also with a local flair. Coffee shops are populated by many residents and attract many young professionals and students.

Garrett Crossing, a shopping center located on the south side of Mebane next to Interstate 85 and Interstate 40, includes a Wal-Mart Supercenter as well as dining and other smaller shops. A Tanger Outlet mall is located on Arrowhead Boulevard on the north side of I-85 in Mebane.

Notable people
 Lucy Hughes Brown, first African American woman physician in South Carolina
 A. Oveta Fuller, associate professor of microbiology and immunology
 Zack Littell, MLB pitcher
 Ricardo Marsh, professional basketball player, 2007 top scorer in the Israel Basketball Premier League
 Junior Robinson, professional basketball player
 Zoë Roth, internet meme known as Disaster Girl

References

External links
 

Cities in North Carolina
Cities in Alamance County, North Carolina
Cities in Orange County, North Carolina
Populated places established in 1881
1881 establishments in North Carolina